Neophaenis is a genus of moths of the family Noctuidae.

Species
 Neophaenis aedemon Dyar, 1909
 Neophaenis boucheri Barbut & Lalanne-Cassou, 2004
 Neophaenis catocala Hampson, 1911
 Neophaenis frauenfeldi (Felder & Rogenhofer, 1874)
 Neophaenis lichenea Hampson, 1918
 Neophaenis meterythra Hampson, 1908
 Neophaenis psittacea (Schaus, 1898)
 Neophaenis respondens (Walker, 1858)

References
Natural History Museum Lepidoptera genus database
Neophaenis at funet

Hadeninae